Alabama Wildlife Management Areas (WMAs) are tracts of land which have been established for the conservation and management of natural resources such as wildlife and aquatic life within the  State of Alabama. The Division of Wildlife and Freshwater Fisheries of the Alabama Department of Conservation and Natural Resources is responsible for the management of these lands and their associated uses. The land is not typically state-owned, but is private land which is leased for public use. The landholders are typically large timber, oil and gas, coal, or infrastructure (railroads, utilities, etc.) companies. Public uses of the WMAs vary from area to area, but typically includes hunting, fishing, trapping, hiking, and camping.

List of Alabama Wildlife Management Areas
Autauga County Community Hunting Area
Barbour County Wildlife Management Area
Black Warrior Wildlife Management Area
Blue Spring Wildlife Management Area
Frank W & Rob M Boykin Wildlife Management Area
Cahaba River Wildlife Management Area
Choccolocco Wildlife Management Area
Coosa Wildlife Management Area
Covington Wildlife Management Area
Demopolis Wildlife Management Area
Freedom Hills Wildlife Management Area
Hollins Wildlife Management Area
Jackson County Waterfowl Management Areas and Refuge
Kinterbish Wildlife Management Area
Lauderdale Wildlife Management Area
Little River Wildlife Management Area
Lowndes Wildlife Management Area
James D Martin-Skyline Wildlife Management Area
Mobile-Tensaw Delta-W L Holland Wildlife Management Area
Mulberry Fork Wildlife Management Area
Sam R Murphy Wildlife Management Area
Oakmulgee Wildlife Management Area
Perdido River Wildlife Management Area
Riverton Community Hunting Area
Gaillard Island Bird Habitat
Scotch Wildlife Management Area
Seven Mile Island Wildlife Management Area
St. Clair Community Hunting Area
Swan Creek-Mallard Fox Creek Wildlife Management Area
Upper Delta Wildlife Management Area
Wolf Creek Wildlife Management Area

References

 
Alabama